Mount Longido is a mountain in located in Longido District of Arusha Region in Tanzania. The peak has an elevation of 2,637 m above sea level. Mount Longido is located in Longido District of Arusha Region.

The principal path to the summit starts in the town of Longido. The climb can be done in one day, but it is also common for climbers to spend one night in a tented camp on the mountain and reach the summit on the second day. Sometimes visitors climb Mount Longido as part of the preparations for the ascent of nearby Mount Kilimanjaro.

See also
 List of Ultras of Africa
 Arusha Region

Gallery

References

Longido